Caroline County Public Schools is the public school system of Caroline County, Virginia, United States. As of 2015, there are about 4,200 students enrolled in 5 schools. There are 3 elementary schools (grades PK-5), 1 middle school (grades 6-8), and 1 high school (grades 9-12.)

Administration

Superintendent 
The current superintendent of Caroline County Public Schools is Sarah Calveric. Before being appointed superintendent, she was the assistant superintendent of Caroline County Public Schools. She was also the director of human resources for Spotsylvania County Public Schools.

School Board 

 JoWanda Rollins-Fells, Chairperson
 Nancy G. Carson, Vice Chairperson
 George L. Spaulding, Jr. 
 Shawn M. Kelley
 Calvin Taylor
 John I. Copeland

Schools 

 Caroline High School
 Caroline Middle School
 Bowling Green Elementary School
 Lewis and Clark Elementary School
 Madison Elementary School

References

External links

Education in Caroline County, Virginia
School divisions in Virginia